Sciota rungsi is a species of snout moth in the genus Sciota. It was described by Patrice J.A. Leraut in 2002. It is found in Spain.

References

Moths described in 2002
Phycitini
Moths of Europe